Helmut Haussmann (born 18 May 1943) is a German academic and politician. He served as minister of economy from 1988 to 1991.

Early life and education
Haussmann was born in Tübingen on 18 May 1943. He holds a degree in economics and social sciences from the University of Tübingen and from the University of Hamburg. He received a PhD in business management from University of Erlangen–Nuremberg in 1976.

Career
Haussmann worked in family business in Baden-Württemberg until 1979 when he became a member of the Bundestag in 1976 with the Free Democratic Party (FDP). He was the secretary-general of the party from 1984 to 1988. On 9 December 1988, he was appointed economy minister, replacing Martin Bangemann in the post. Haussmann served in the coalition cabinet led by Helmut Kohl during the reunification process of West and East Germany. Haussmann was reelected to the Bundestag from Baden-Wurttemberg state on 2 December 1990. He resigned from his ministerial post on 4 December 1990, but remained in office until 18 January 1991 and Jürgen W. Möllemann succeeded him as economy minister. 

Since 1996, he has been an honorary professor and teaching international management at University of Erlangen–Nuremberg. In 2001, he became chairman of the advisory board of GEMINI Executive Search. He has also been adjunct professor at the University of Tübingen where he has been teaching international business since 2010.

Personal life
Haussmann is a Protestant. He was criticized due to his lavish life-style when he was economy minister and was referred to as the "yuppie minister."

References

External links

1943 births
Economy ministers of Germany
German Protestants
Living people
Members of the Bundestag for Baden-Württemberg
Members of the Bundestag 1998–2002
Members of the Bundestag 1994–1998
Members of the Bundestag 1990–1994
Members of the Bundestag 1987–1990
Members of the Bundestag 1983–1987
Members of the Bundestag 1980–1983
Members of the Bundestag 1976–1980
People from Tübingen
Recipients of the Cross of the Order of Merit of the Federal Republic of Germany
University of Erlangen-Nuremberg alumni
Academic staff of the University of Erlangen-Nuremberg
University of Hamburg alumni
University of Tübingen alumni
Academic staff of the University of Tübingen
Members of the Bundestag for the Free Democratic Party (Germany)